The Steed-Kisker culture is a cultural phase (name that archaeologists give to a group of culturally similar peoples) that is part of the larger Central Plains Village tradition of the Plains Village period. This term applies to the prehistoric peoples who occupied the Great Plains region of the modern-day United States in prehistoric times.

The Steed-Kisker culture applied to those living primarily in the area of present-day Kansas City, Missouri (MO) for the several hundred years from about 900 to 1400 CE. From about 1000 to 1250, they are believed to have originally been made up of a group of farmers who migrated from the Cahokia region east of the Mississippi River. As they adapted to local conditions and materials, they made changes in their traditional customs. They are considered to link the people of the Plains Village period to the larger Middle Mississippian culture and trading network.

Initially numerous Cahokia-style projectile points were found here, and a trading link was theorized. But more recently, other evidence, such as "wall trench house construction, quantification of non-local trade materials", and evidence of two temple mound communities on the lower Missouri River (which were destroyed, used for fill in railroad development in the 19th century) have indicated more direct relations and early settlement by people from Cahokia.

The Cloverdale archaeological site near St. Joseph, Missouri is one of the more important sites associated with the phase, showing occupation about 1200 CE. Other sites with Steed-Kisker occupations include the Crabtree Site (23CL164), the Katz Site (23CL163) and the Steed-Kisker Site, for which the culture is named.

Cahokia was more than 320 miles by waterways from the Cloverdale site; it was located near a small tributary of the Illinois River and east of the Mississippi River in present-day Illinois, on a latitude with the future site of St. Louis. It had a large territory of influence along the major tributaries.

See also
Mississippian culture
Plains Indians

Notes

References
 Logan, Brad. "Archaeological Investigations at the Evans Locality Stranger Creek Valley, Northeastern Kansas-2003"  Department of Sociology, Anthropology, and Social Work. Kansas State University, Manhattan, 2003.
 O’Brien, Patricia J. "Steed-Kisker: A Western Mississippian Settlement System."  In, Mississippian Settlement Patterns, edited by Bruce D. Smith, pp. 1–19, 1978. Academic Press, New York.
 O'Brien, Patricia J. "Steed-Kisker: A Cultural Interpretation."  The Missouri Archaeologist 42: 96–108, 1981.
 O'Brien, Patricia J. "Ancient Kansas City Area Borders and Trails."  The Missouri Archaeologist 49: 27–39, 1988.
 O'Brien, Patricia J. "Steed-Kisker: The Western Periphery of the Mississippian Tradition.: Midcontinental Journal of Archaeology 18 (1): 281-283, 1993.
 Roper, Donna. "Central Plains Tradition" In Kansas Archaeology, edited by Robert J. Hoard and William E. Banks, pp. 105–132, 2006. University Press of Kansas, Lawrence.
 Wedel, Waldo R. "Archaeological Investigations in Platte and Clay Counties, Missouri."  Smithsonian Institution, United States National Museum Bulletin 183. Washington D.C.: Smithsonian Institution, 1943.

Middle Mississippian culture
Native American history of Missouri
Archaeological cultures of North America
Plains tribes
9th-century establishments in North America
14th-century disestablishments in North America